François Charles Mauriac (11 October 1885 – 1 September 1970) was a French novelist, dramatist, critic, poet, and journalist, a member of the Académie française (from 1933), and laureate of the Nobel Prize in Literature (1952). He was awarded the Grand Cross of the Légion d'honneur in 1958. He was a life-long Catholic.

Biography
François Charles Mauriac was born in Bordeaux, France. He studied literature at the University of Bordeaux, graduating in 1905, after which he moved to Paris to prepare for postgraduate study at the École des Chartes.

On 1 June 1933, he was elected a member of the Académie française, succeeding Eugène Brieux.

A former Action française supporter, he turned to the left during the Spanish Civil War, criticizing the Catholic Church for its support of Franco. After the fall of France to the Axis during the Second World War, he briefly supported the collaborationist régime of Marshal Pétain, but joined the Resistance as early as December 1941. He was the only member of the Académie française to publish a Resistance text with the Editions de Minuit.

Mauriac had a bitter dispute with Albert Camus immediately following the Liberation of France. At that time, Camus edited the Resistance paper Combat (thereafter an overt daily, until 1947), while Mauriac wrote a column for Le Figaro. Camus said newly liberated France should purge all Nazi collaborator elements, but Mauriac warned that such disputes should be set aside in the interests of national reconciliation. Mauriac also doubted that justice would be impartial or dispassionate, given the emotional turmoil of the Liberation. Despite having been viciously criticised by Robert Brasillach, he campaigned against his execution.

Mauriac also had a bitter public dispute with Roger Peyrefitte, who criticised the Vatican in books such as Les Clés de saint Pierre (1953). Mauriac threatened to resign from the paper he was working with at the time (L'Express) if they did not stop carrying advertisements for Peyrefitte's books. The quarrel was exacerbated by the release of the film adaptation of Peyrefitte's Les Amitiés Particulières, and culminated in a virulent open letter by Peyrefitte in which he accused Mauriac of homosexual tendencies and called him a Tartuffe, hypocrite.

Mauriac was opposed to French rule in Vietnam, and strongly condemned the use of torture by the French army in Algeria.

In 1952, he won the Nobel Prize in Literature "for the deep spiritual insight and the artistic intensity with which he has in his novels penetrated the drama of human life". He was awarded the Grand Cross of the Légion d'honneur in 1958. He published a series of personal memoirs and a biography of Charles de Gaulle.
Mauriac's complete works were published in twelve volumes between 1950 and 1956. He encouraged Elie Wiesel to write about his experiences as a Jewish teenager during the Holocaust, and wrote the foreword to Elie Wiesel's book Night.

He was the father of writer Claude Mauriac and grandfather of Anne Wiazemsky, a French actress and author who worked with and married French director Jean-Luc Godard.

François Mauriac died in Paris on 1 September 1970, and was interred in the Cimetière de Vemars, Val d'Oise, France.

Awards and honours
 1926 — Grand Prix du roman de l'Académie française
 1933 — Member of the Académie française
 1952 — Nobel Prize in Literature
 1958 — Grand Cross of the Légion d'honneur

Works

Novels, novellas and short stories
 1913 – L'Enfant chargé de chaînes («Young Man in Chains», tr. 1961)
 1914 – La Robe prétexte («The Stuff of Youth», tr. 1960)
 1920 – La Chair et le Sang («Flesh and Blood», tr. 1954)
 1921 – Préséances («Questions of Precedence», tr. 1958)
 1922 – Le Baiser au lépreux («The Kiss to the Leper», tr. 1923 / «A Kiss to the Leper», tr. 1950)
 1923 – Le Fleuve de feu («The River of Fire», tr. 1954)
 1923 – Génitrix («Genetrix», tr. 1950)
 1923 – Le Mal («The Enemy», tr. 1949)
 1925 – Le Désert de l'amour  («The Desert of Love», tr. 1949) (Awarded the Grand Prix du roman de l'Académie française, 1926.)
 1927 – Thérèse Desqueyroux («Thérèse», tr. 1928 / «Thérèse Desqueyroux», tr. 1947 and 2005)
 1928 – Destins («Destinies», tr. 1929 / «Lines of Life», tr. 1957)
 1929 – Trois Récits A volume of three stories: Coups de couteau, 1926; Un homme de lettres, 1926; Le Démon de la connaissance, 1928
 1930 – Ce qui était perdu («Suspicion», tr. 1931 / «That Which Was Lost», tr. 1951)
 1932 – Le Nœud de vipères («Vipers' Tangle», tr. 1933 / «The Knot of Vipers», tr. 1951)
 1933 – Le Mystère Frontenac («The Frontenac Mystery», tr. 1951 / «The Frontenacs», tr. 1961)
 1935 – La Fin de la nuit («The End of the Night», tr. 1947)
 1936 – Les Anges noirs («The Dark Angels», tr. 1951 / «The Mask of Innocence», tr. 1953)
 1938 – Plongées A volume of five stories: Thérèse chez le docteur, 1933 («Thérèse and the Doctor», tr. 1947); Thérèse à l'hôtel, 1933 («Thérèse at the Hotel», tr. 1947); Le Rang; Insomnie; Conte de Noël.
 1939 – Les Chemins de la mer («The Unknown Sea», tr. 1948)
 1941 – La Pharisienne («A Woman of Pharisees», tr. 1946)
 1951 – Le Sagouin («The Weakling», tr. 1952 / «The Little Misery», tr. 1952) (A novella)
 1952 – Galigaï («The Loved and the Unloved», tr. 1953)
 1954 – L'Agneau («The Lamb», tr. 1955)
 1969 – Un adolescent d'autrefois («Maltaverne», tr. 1970)
 1972 – Maltaverne (the unfinished sequel to the previous novel; posthumously published)

Plays
 1938 – Asmodée («Asmodée; or, The Intruder», tr. 1939 / «Asmodée: A Drama in Three Acts», tr. 1957)
 1945 – Les Mal Aimés
 1948 – Passage du malin
 1951 – Le Feu sur terre

Poetry
 1909 – Les Mains jointes
 1911 – L'Adieu à l'Adolescence
 1925 – Orages
 1940 – Le Sang d'Atys

Memoirs
 1931 – Holy Thursday: an Intimate Remembrance
 1960 – Mémoires intérieurs
 1962 – Ce Que Je Crois
 1964 – Soirée Tu Danse

Biography
 1937 – Life of Jesus
 1964 - De Gaulle de François Mauriac (French edition), 1966 English -(Doubleday)

Essays and criticism
 1919 – Petits Essais de Psychologie Religieuse: De quelques coeurs inquiets. Paris: Societe litteraire de France. 1919.
 1936 - “God and Mammon” in ‘Essays in Order: New Series, No. 1’. Edited by Christopher Dawson and Bernard Wall. Published in London by Sheed & Ward
 1961 – Second Thoughts: Reflections on literature and on Life (tr. by Adrienne Foulke). Darwen Finlayson
  Edited and translated by Nathan Bracher.

Further reading
 Scott, Malcolm (1980), Mauriac: The Politics of a Novelist, Scottish Academic Press, 
 Dudley Edwards, Owen (1982), review of Mauriac: The Politics of a Novelist by Malcolm Scott, in Murray, Glen (ed.), Cencrastus No. 8, Spring 1982, pp. 46 & 47,

See also

Georges Bernanos
Julien Green

References

External links

 
 Le site littéraire François Mauriac  
 The François Mauriac Centre at Malagar (Saint-Maixant, Gironde) 
 
 Université McGill: le roman selon les romanciers   Inventory and analysis of François Mauriac's non-noveltistic writing
  
 

1885 births
1970 deaths
Writers from Bordeaux
French Roman Catholic writers
20th-century French novelists
20th-century French dramatists and playwrights
French literary critics
French male novelists
Members of the Académie Française
Nobel laureates in Literature
French Nobel laureates
Grand Croix of the Légion d'honneur
Grand Prix du roman de l'Académie française winners
20th-century French journalists
Christian novelists
Christian humanists
Le Figaro people